The 2017–18 Magnolia Hotshots season was the 30th season of the franchise in the Philippine Basketball Association (PBA).

Key dates

2017
October 29: The 2017 PBA draft took place in Midtown Atrium, Robinson Place Manila.

Draft picks

Roster

Philippine Cup

Eliminations

Standings

Game log

|- style="background:#bfb;"
| 1
| December 20
| Alaska
| W 108–95
| Paul Lee (30)
| Ian Sangalang (10)
| three players (6)
| Filoil Flying V Centre
| 1–0
|- style="background:#fcc;"
| 2
| December 25
| Barangay Ginebra
| L 78–89
| Ian Sangalang (25)
| Ian Sangalang (11)
| Mark Barroca (9)
| Philippine Arena22,531
| 1–1

|- style="background:#bfb;"
| 3
| January 10
| Kia
| W 124–77
| Justin Melton (23)
| Ian Sangalang (9)
| Justin Melton (8)
| Smart Araneta Coliseum
| 2–1
|- style="background:#bfb;"
| 4
| January 14
| NLEX
| W 105–94
| Paul Lee (21)
| Marc Pingris (15)
| Mark Barroca (8)
| Smart Araneta Coliseum
| 3–1
|- style="background:#bfb;"
| 5
| January 20
| Phoenix
| W 97–91
| Paul Lee (20)
| Marc Pingris (17)
| Marc Pingris (4)
| Cuneta Astrodome
| 4–1
|- style="background:#bfb;"
| 6
| January 27
| TNT
| W 91–83
| Mark Barroca (20)
| Justin Melton (10)
| Barroca, Jalalon (5)
| Smart Araneta Coliseum
| 5–1

|- style="background:#bfb;"
| 7
| February 2
| Blackwater
| W 78–72
| Barroca, Ramos (14)
| Marc Pingris (12)
| Marc Pingris (8)
| Mall of Asia Arena
| 6–1
|- style="background:#fcc;"
| 8
| February 4
| San Miguel
| L 76–77
| Mark Barroca (21)
| Marc Pingris (14)
| three players (4)
| Ynares Center
| 6–2
|- style="background:#fcc;"
| 9
| February 10
| Rain or Shine
| L 95–101
| Aldrech Ramos (27)
| Rafi Reavis (11)
| Jio Jalalon (8)
| Calasiao Sports Complex
| 6–3
|- style="background:#bfb;"
| 10
| February 16
| GlobalPort
| W 96–81
| Rome dela Rosa (18)
| three players (6)
| Justin Melton (5)
| Smart Araneta Coliseum
| 7–3
|- style="background:#bfb;"
| 11
| February 24
| Meralco
| W 94–65
| Paul Lee (21)
| Marc Pingris (10)
| Barroca, Pingris
| Xavier University Gym
| 8–3

Playoffs

Bracket

Game log

|- style="background:#bfb;"
| 1
| March 6
| GlobalPort
| W 86–79
| Mark Barroca (17)
| Paul Lee (13)
| Jio Jalalon (4)
| Mall of Asia Arena
| 1–0

|- style="background:#fcc;"
| 1
| March 10
| NLEX
| L 87–88
| Ian Sangalang (21)
| Ian Sangalang (9)
| Jio Jalalon (6)
| Smart Araneta Coliseum
| 0–1
|- style="background:#bfb;"
| 2
| March 12
| NLEX
| W 99–84
| Paul Lee (27)
| Ian Sangalang (8)
| Jio Jalalon (10)
| Mall of Asia Arena
| 1–1
|- style="background:#bfb;"
| 3
| March 14
| NLEX
| W 106–99
| Jio Jalalon (25)
| Rafi Reavis (10)
| Paul Lee (6)
| Smart Araneta Coliseum
| 2–1
|- style="background:#fcc;"
| 4
| March 16
| NLEX
| L 79–91
| Ian Sangalang (15)
| Ian Sangalang (14)
| Mark Barroca (7)
| Mall of Asia Arena
| 2–2
|- style="background:#bfb;"
| 5
| March 18
| NLEX
| W 87–78
| Mark Barroca (18)
| Ian Sangalang (11)
| Ian Sangalang (6)
| Ynares Center
| 3–2
|- style="background:#bfb;"
| 6
| March 20
| NLEX
| W 96–89
| Ian Sangalang (15)
| Ian Sangalang (11)
| Jio Jalalon (13)
| Smart Araneta Coliseum
| 4–2

|- style="background:#bfb;"
| 1
| March 23
| San Miguel
| W 105–103
| Ian Sangalang (29)
| Reavis, Sangalang (9)
| Barroca, Lee (5)
| Smart Araneta Coliseum
| 1–0
|- style="background:#fcc;"
| 2
| March 25
| San Miguel
| L 77–92
| Mark Barroca (18)
| dela Rosa, Reavis 6
| three players (3)
| Mall of Asia Arena
| 1–1
|- style="background:#fcc;"
| 3
| April 1
| San Miguel
| L 87–111
| Mark Barroca (22)
| Rafi Reavis (14)
| Paul Lee (7)
| Smart Araneta Coliseum
| 1–2
|- style="background:#fcc;"
| 4
| April 4
| San Miguel
| L 80–84
| Ian Sangalang (22)
| Ian Sangalang (11)
| Paul Lee (6)
| Smart Araneta Coliseum
| 1–3
|- style="background:#fcc;"
| 5
| April 6
| San Miguel
| L 99–108 (2OT)
| Paul Lee (21)
| Rafi Reavis (12)
| Mark Barroca (8)
| Mall of Asia Arena
| 1–4

Commissioner's Cup

Eliminations

Standings

Game log

|- style="background:#fcc;"
| 1
| May 6
| Phoenix
| L 87–89
| Vernon Macklin (25)
| Vernon Macklin (17)
| Jio Jalalon (7)
| Mall of Asia Arena
| 0–1
|- style="background:#bfb;"
| 2
| May 12
| GlobalPort
| W 92–87
| Ian Sangalang (22)
| Vernon Macklin (13)
| Mark Barroca (7)
| Angeles University Foundation Sports Arena
| 1–1
|- style="background:#bfb;"
| 3
| May 16
| Columbian
| W 126–101
| Vernon Macklin (19)
| Jio Jalalon (9)
| Paul Lee (8)
| Smart Araneta Coliseum
| 2–1
|- style="background:#bfb;"
| 4
| May 18
| Meralco
| W 81–79
| Vernon Macklin (21)
| Vernon Macklin (15)
| Paul Lee (6)
| Smart Araneta Coliseum
| 3–1
|- align="center"
|colspan="9" bgcolor="#bbcaff"|All-Star Break

|- style="background:#fcc;"
| 5
| June 2
| Rain or Shine
| L 96–99 (OT)
| dela Rosa, Kelly (19)
| Curtis Kelly (15)
| Jio Jalalon (7)
| Smart Araneta Coliseum
| 3–2
|- style="background:#fcc;"
| 6
| June 6
| Blackwater
| L 84–86
| Mark Barroca (16)
| Curtis Kelly (9)
| Jio Jalalon (7)
| Smart Araneta Coliseum
| 3–3
|- style="background:#fcc;"
| 7
| June 10
| Alaska
| L 99–103
| Jackson, Lee (21)
| Justin Jackson (13)
| Justin Jackson (6)
| Smart Araneta Coliseum
| 3–4
|- style="background:#bfb;"
| 8
| June 13
| TNT
| W 111–89
| Paul Lee (25)
| Justin Jackson (19)
| Justin Jackson (7)
| Mall of Asia Arena
| 4–4
|- style="background:#fcc;"
| 9
| June 17
| Barangay Ginebra
| L 84–104
| Justin Jackson (21)
| Justin Jackson (15)
| Justin Jackson (4)
| Smart Araneta Coliseum
| 4–5

|- style="background:#bfb;"
| 10
| July 4
| NLEX
| W 116–89
| Wayne Chism (27)
| Wayne Chism (8)
| Jio Jalalon (8)
| Mall of Asia Arena
| 5–5
|- style="background:#bfb;"
| 11
| July 7
| San Miguel
| W 101–97
| Wayne Chism (21)
| Wayne Chism (14)
| Justin Melton (7)
| Smart Araneta Coliseum
| 6–5

Playoffs

Bracket

Game log

|- style="background:#fcc;"
| 1
| July 10
| Alaska
| L 78–89
| Wayne Chism (20)
| Wayne Chism (15)
| Mark Barroca (5)
| Smart Araneta Coliseum
| 0–1

Governors' Cup

Eliminations

Standings

Game log

|- style="background:#bfb;"
| 1
| August 22
| NLEX
| W 102–72
| Romeo Travis (21)
| Romeo Travis (13)
| Jio Jalalon (9)
| Smart Araneta Coliseum
| 1–0

|- style="background:#bfb;"
| 2
| September 1
| NorthPort
| W 104–87
| Mark Barroca (20)
| Romeo Travis (22)
| Jio Jalalon (8)
| Smart Araneta Coliseum
| 2–0
|- style="background:#fcc;"
| 3
| September 23
| Phoenix
| L 82–95
| Romeo Travis (28)
| Romeo Travis (19)
| Jio Jalalon (5)
| Smart Araneta Coliseum
| 2–1
|- style="background:#bfb;"
| 4
| September 26
| Rain or Shine
| W 92–76
| Lee, Travis (28)
| Romeo Travis (16)
| Paul Lee (7)
| Smart Araneta Coliseum
| 3–1
|- style="background:#bfb;"
| 5
| September 30
| San Miguel
| W 109–108
| Paul Lee (28)
| Romeo Travis (12)
| Jio Jalalon (7)
| Smart Araneta Coliseum
| 4–1

|- style="background:#bfb;"
| 6
| October 3
| Columbian
| W 113–95
| Romeo Travis (32)
| Romeo Travis (14)
| Jio Jalalon (9)
| Smart Araneta Coliseum
| 5–1
|- style="background:#bfb;"
| 7
| October 10
| Blackwater
| W 133–99
| Romeo Travis (22)
| Jalalon, Travis (12)
| Jio Jalalon (13)
| Cuneta Astrodome
| 6–1
|- style="background:#bfb;"
| 8
| October 14
| Alaska
| W 83–73
| Romeo Travis (19)
| Romeo Travis (17)
| Jio Jalalon (5)
| Smart Araneta Coliseum
| 7–1
|- style="background:#fcc;"
| 9
| October 19
| Meralco
| L 88–94
| Romeo Travis (25)
| Romeo Travis (19)
| Jio Jalalon (6)
| Ynares Center
| 7–2
|- style="background:#bfb;"
| 10
| October 26
| TNT
| W 116–103
| Ian Sangalang (28)
| Romeo Travis (15)
| Paul Lee (8)
| Ynares Center
| 8–2
|- style="background:#fcc;"
| 11
| October 28
| Barangay Ginebra
| L 86–93
| Romeo Travis (30)
| Sangalang, Travis (7)
| Jio Jalalon (7)
| Smart Araneta Coliseum
| 8–3

Playoffs

Bracket

Game log

|- style="background:#bfb;"
| 1
| November 6
| Blackwater
| W 103–99
| Paul Lee (22)
| Romeo Travis (10)
| Romeo Travis (12)
| Smart Araneta Coliseum
| 1–0

|- style="background:#bfb;"
| 1
| November 10
| Barangay Ginebra
| W 106–98
| Romeo Travis (37)
| Romeo Travis (16)
| Romeo Travis (5)
| Ynares Center
| 1–0
|- style="background:#bfb;"
| 2
| November 12
| Barangay Ginebra
| W 101–97
| Romeo Travis (25)
| Romeo Travis (12)
| Barroca, Travis (7)
| Smart Araneta Coliseum
| 2–0
|- style="background:#fcc;"
| 3
| November 14
| Barangay Ginebra
| L 103–107
| Mark Barroca (19)
| Ian Sangalang (11)
| Jio Jalalon (8)
| Smart Araneta Coliseum
| 2–1
|- style="background:#bfb;"
| 4
| November 16
| Barangay Ginebra
| W 112–108
| Romeo Travis (50)
| Romeo Travis (13)
| Ian Sangalang (6)
| Ynares Center
| 3–1

|- style="background:#;"
| 1
| December 5
| Alaska
| 
| 
| 
| 
| Mall of Asia Arena
| –
|- style="background:#;"
| 2
| December 7
| Alaska
| 
| 
| 
| 
| Smart Araneta Coliseum
| –
|- style="background:#;"
| 3
| December 9
| Alaska
| 
| 
| 
| 
| Ynares Center
| –
|- style="background:#;"
| 4
| December 12
| Alaska
| 
| 
| 
| 
| Smart Araneta Coliseum
| –
|- style="background:#;"
| 5*
| December 14
| Alaska
| 
| 
| 
| 
| Smart Araneta Coliseum
| –
|- style="background:#;"
| 6*
| December 16
| Alaska
| 
| 
| 
| 
| 
| –
|- style="background:#;"
| 7*
| December 19
| Alaska
| 
| 
| 
| 
| 
| –

Transactions

Trades

Preseason

Recruited imports

Awards

References

Magnolia Hotshots seasons
Magnolia